This includes a list of airports in Uttar Pradesh. The list includes domestic, training and international airports.

Contents
This list contains the following information:
Area served – Town or city where the airport is located. This may not always be an exact location as some airports are situated in the periphery of the town/citiy they serve.
ICAO – The four letter airport code assigned by the International Civil Aviation Organization. ICAO codes for India start with VA [West Zone - Mumbai Center], VE [East Zone - Kolkata Center], VI [North Zone - Delhi Center] and VO [South Zone - Chennai Center]
IATA – The three letter airport code assigned by the International Air Transport Association
Airport Type – Type of the airport, including the terminology used by Airports Authority of India, as per the first table below
Airport Functional Status – Functional status of the airport as per the second table below

List 

 LIAL is a consortium of Adani Group and AAI.

See also 
 List of airports by ICAO code: V#VA VE VI VO - India
 Wikipedia:WikiProject Aviation/Airline destination lists: Asia#India
 Busiest airports in India by total passenger traffic

References

Sources
 
 Airports Authority of India website: AirportsIndia.org.in or AAI.aero
 
  - includes IATA codes
 Great Circle Mapper - IATA and ICAO codes
 List of Indian Air Force Stations at GlobalSecurity.org
 scribd - Directory of Airports in India with codes and coordinates
 PilotFriend - Indian Airstrips

 
Uttar Pradesh
Airports